Happy Killers is a 2010 South Korean comedy-thriller film. It was adapted from a mystery short story of the same title written by Seo Mi-ae in 2005.

Plot
Jung-min is the new detective assigned to a neighborhood where a serial killer commits murder every rainy Thursday. Laidback and blundering at his job, Jung-min is actually secretly studying for a civil servant exam to get away from his boss who's always picking on him. Every day, residents protest outside the police station, shouting that the police should make up for the falling apartment prices and catch the murderer. To make matters worse, Jung-min's mother who happens to be the president of the women's association is leading the protest. He vows to catch the killer this time in order to save his dignity as a detective and a son. However, his elaborate plans are upset by the appearance of Young-seok, the neighborhood unemployed bum. Because of the reward for the killer's capture, Young-seok is trying to catch him well, and his natural detective skills lead him to always arrive at the crime scene one step ahead of the police. Furthermore, he criticizes every little thing that Jung-min does and is a royal pain in the neck. Jung-min absolutely cannot let Young-seok solve the case and take away his chance of a lifetime, so a rivalry forms between the two as they both race to catch the killer.

Cast

Kim Dong-wook as Detective Choi Jung-min
Yu Oh-seong as Kim Young-seok
Shim Eun-kyung as Kim Ha-rin, Young-seok's daughter
Kim Eung-soo as Team leader
Kim Seon-hyuk as Detective Im
Lee Mi-do as Jjookkoomi ("webfoot octopus")
Han Seong-sik as Distributor
Jin Kyung as Mi-young
Lee Jae-gu as Young-seok's friend
Lee Yul as Yi-kyung
Jeong Jong-yeol as Detective 1 
Jeong Mi-seong as Detective 2 
Lee Ho-yeon as Detective 3 
Shin Jeong-min as Player 1 
Baek Eun-kyeong as Player 2 
Lee Soo-jin as Player 3 
Lee Myeong-ho as Jae-won 
Kim Ri-ah as First victim 
Lee Jang-mi as Second victim 
Kim Mi-yeong as Third victim
Jo Kyeong-sook as Small store owner 
Kwon Oh-jin as Drunkard 
Tak Seong-eun as Nurse 
Jeon Seong-ae as Adviser for studying abroad 
Kim Ji-eun as Homeroom teacher 
Kim Jeong-sik as Teacher 1 
Shin Hye-jeong as Teacher 2 
Oh Ki-hwan as Apartment security guard 
Kim Kang-woo as Male demonstrator 1 
Choi In-soo as Male demonstrator 2 
Kim Mi-joon as Female demonstrator 1
Jeong Mi-hye as Female demonstrator 2
Kwon Beom-taek as Chief of police
Seong Hyeon-joon as Criminal psychologist 
Son Kyeong-min as Pretty boy in adult entertainment district
Heo Haeng-wook as Convenience store worker 
Kim Tae-hyeong as Delivery worker 
Ok Ja-yeong as Weather forecaster 
Ryoo Sang-woo as Scooter man 
Kim Hyo-je as Airport security worker 
Oh Yeon-seo as Magazine model 
Sung Ji-ru as Taxi driver (cameo)
Song Ok-sook as Jung-min's mother (cameo)

Reception
Shim Eun-kyung received Best New Actress nominations at the 47th Grand Bell Awards in 2010 and the 47th Baeksang Arts Awards in 2011.

References

External links
 

2010 films
South Korean comedy thriller films
2010s South Korean films